Geddington is a village and civil parish on the A4300, previously A43, in North Northamptonshire between Kettering and Corby. The population of the civil parish at the 2011 census was 1,503, virtually unchanged from 1,504 at the 2001 census.

The villages name means 'Farm/settlement connected Gaete' or 'farm/settlement connected with Geiti'. Alternatively, 'goat place farm/settlement'.

The village contains an Eleanor cross. The monument dates from 1294, when the crosses were raised as a memorial by Edward I (1239–1307) to his late wife, Eleanor of Castile (1241–1290). There were originally 12 monuments, one in each resting place of the funeral procession as they travelled to Westminster Abbey. The Geddington cross is one of only three Eleanor crosses still standing; the other two being in Hardingstone (near Northampton) and Waltham Cross, although remnants and reconstructions of the lost ones can also be seen at other sites. The Geddington cross is regarded as the best preserved.

The village was also formerly home to a Royal hunting lodge which was used as a base by monarchs for hunting within the Royal forest of Rockingham. The building has subsequently been lost; however, the "King's Door" within the church of St Mary Magdalene, Geddington in the village remains, it was the entrance through which the King could enter the building while staying at the lodge.

The old main road runs through the village and crosses the River Ise by a spectacular mediaeval bridge. The bridge, built in 1250, has five arches and three pedestrian refuges. A more recent ford also runs alongside the bridge. The village is famous for its annual boxing day squirt in which a barrel attached to a rope across the river is squirted from one side of the ford to the other by competing fire crews from Geddington and Kettering.

Geddington has two public houses: namely, The Star Inn and The White Hart. The village has no shop and the small post office/ newsagents has now closed.

Transport

There is a partial cycle path from the village to the nearby town of Kettering and the village of Weekley, but difficulty crossing the road at Weekley means cycling remains an underused mode of transportation.

See also
Duke of Buccleuch

References

External links 

Geddington Village website
Bus service 8 links Geddington with Kettering and Corby
A link to a short article with images describing the likely circumstances surrounding the transfer of Queen Eleanor's body to Westminster
English Heritage page on Geddington's Cross 
Walking tour with pictures

Villages in Northamptonshire
English royal forests
Civil parishes in Northamptonshire
North Northamptonshire